Terraferma is a 2011 Italian drama film directed by Emanuele Crialese. The film premiered at the 68th Venice International Film Festival. The film was selected as the Italian entry for the Best Foreign Language Film at the 84th Academy Awards, but it did not make the final shortlist.

Plot 
On Linosa, fishermen are punished for saving illegal immigrants (boat people) from the sea and, back on shore, letting them go, because this amounts to facilitating illegal immigration. Therefore young local Filippo does not allow them on his boat. Several die, and Filippo changes his mind about the matter: he helps a family consisting of a mother, a little boy and a newborn baby, to leave to the Italian mainland.

Cast 
 Filippo Pucillo as Filippo
 Donatella Finocchiaro as Giulietta
 Mimmo Cuticchio as Ernesto
 Giuseppe Fiorello as Nino
 Timnit T. as Sara
 Claudio Santamaria as Santamaria
 Tiziana Lodato as  Maria

Production 
The film was produced through Italy's Cattleya with 10% co-production support from France, including 200,000 euro from France 2 Cinéma and money from the CNC. The total budget was 7.85€ million.

Release 
The film premiered at the 68th Venice International Film Festival where it was screened in competition. It won the Special Jury Prize at the Venice Film Festival, the equivalent of third place. It was released in Italy on 7 September 2011 through 01 Distribution.

Reception 
Rotten Tomatoes, a review aggregator, reports that 68% of 19 surveyed critics gave the film a positive review; the average rating was 6.6/10. Jay Weissberg of Variety described it as "a well-made movie with no pretension but also no crying need to be at a major film festival." Deborah Young of The Hollywood Reporter called it "a morally passionate social drama, muted by overly familiar storytelling." Gary Goldstein of the Los Angeles Times wrote, "The thematically rich production is grounded in deep moral and emotional reflection." Chuck Wilson of The Village Voice called it predictable and heavy-handed.

See also 
 List of submissions to the 84th Academy Awards for Best Foreign Language Film
 List of Italian submissions for the Academy Award for Best Foreign Language Film
 List of Italian films of 2011

References

See also 
 Movies about immigration to Italy

External links 
  
 

2011 films
2011 drama films
2010s Italian-language films
Italian drama films
Films about illegal immigration to Europe
Films set in Sicily
Venice Grand Jury Prize winners